First Anniversary may refer to:

 "First Anniversary" (The Outer Limits), a television episode
 1st Anniversary, a 2003 album by Melon Kinenbi
 The First Anniversary: An Anatomy of the World, a 1611 poem by John Donne

See also
 Anniversary (disambiguation)
 Wedding anniversary